École Secondaire Paul Kane High School (PKHS) is a dual track high school in St. Albert, Alberta, Canada and is a part of St. Albert Public Schools. Opening in 1963, Paul Kane was the first Protestant high school in St. Albert. The school was named after Paul Kane, a painter known for his paintings of western Canadian First Nations people. The school currently has an enrollment of just under 1,300 students. Paul Kane's school colours are blue and white, with its sports teams being named the Blues. PKHS has sports programs including basketball, rugby, volleyball, and football.

The planned replacement of the current building for the school was announced by the Alberta Government as part of their 2018 budget. The replacement is expected to occur in the second semester of the 2022–2023 school year, and will be the third building that the school has occupied.

Programs of study 
Required programs offered include the 10 to 30 level courses in both the 1 and 2 sequences. Some 14 and 24 level courses are also offered.

History 
Paul Kane High School was the first Protestant high school in St. Albert. It was built as a response by its school district – then called Protestant Separate School District No. 6 – to the rapid growth of the Protestant population in St. Albert. Before Paul Kane was built, the only other option for high school students in St. Albert was to attend St. Albert Catholic High School. The school was named after Paul Kane, a painter who had once been commissioned by the Hudson Bay Company to paint pictures of the life of the aboriginal people in the Canadian West. At the school's inauguration, a representative of the company presented a trophy to the Student's Union, to be given each year to the grade 12 student who achieves the best score in his or her final testing.

Construction on the first site for Paul Kane High School began in 1961, with the school opening its doors for its first students on September 1, 1963. The building cost $515,832 to build, housing 20 staff members and 343 students from grade 7 to 12. The building was designed as an experimental "windowless school," with each classroom having only one window, and the building itself having a central skylight. The concept was used both to reduce heat transfer from outside, and to prevent the distraction of the school's students. Some rooms had removable partitions that teachers could use to join classrooms, causing complaints of noise from the students. Some students described the setup as "prison-like."

By the early 1970s, the school could no longer accommodate its students, and so a new school was built across the field. The new location opened its doors in 1973, with students reportedly having "lugged their desks across the field" only to resume classes shortly after. The first location became Lorne Akins Junior High.

A study was done in 1979 on the feasibility of Paul Kane getting a football team; the school didn't get a team until 2011.

In 2012, Paul Kane's Protestant school district, as well as the schools under it, became public at the request of the Alberta government. The new district became formally known as St. Albert Public School District No. 5565, or St. Albert Public Schools for short.

2022 Replacement Project 

In March 2018 the Alberta government announced it would be replacing Paul Kane High School as part of Budget 2018. Citing aging infrastructure and a growing student base, the government identified that the existing school would no longer be able to meet the needs of its students. The new school is scheduled to be built during the 2022–2023 school year and will expand capacity by 500 students, bringing the total students served up to 1,500. The cost of the project is expected to range between $45–80 million, making the school the largest of the projects announced in the budget.

Draft plans for the new school were released in February 2019. The new building will be located directly behind the old building. Among other features, the school will contain two floors, large windows, a larger gym with an attached drama room, 300 parking stalls, solar panels, and a new soccer field where the old school once stood.

Alumni 
Paul Kane has produced a number of notable Alumni, many of whom are known for their achievements in athletics.

Notes

Notes

External links
Paul Kane High School

References 

High schools in Alberta
Schools in St. Albert, Alberta
1963 establishments in Alberta
Educational institutions established in 1963